Tabot (Ge'ez ታቦት tābōt, sometimes spelled tabout) is a Ge'ez word referring to a replica of the Tablets of Law, onto which the Biblical Ten Commandments were inscribed, used in the practices of Orthodox Tewahedo Christians in the Ethiopian Orthodox Church and Eritrean Orthodox Church. Tabot can also refer to a replica of the Ark of the Covenant.  The word tsellat (Ge'ez: ጽላት tsallāt, modern ṣellāt) refers only to a replica of the Tablets, but is less commonly used.

According to Edward Ullendorff, the Ge'ez (an Ethiopian Semitic language) word tabot is derived from the Aramaic word tebuta (tebota), like the Hebrew word tebah. "The concept and function of the tabot represent one of the most remarkable areas of agreement with Old Testament forms of worship."

Description
It is always kept in ornate coverings to hide it from public view. In an elaborate procession, which has often reminded literate onlookers of the sixth chapter of 2 Samuel where King David leads the people dancing before the Ark, the tabot is carried around the church courtyard on the patronal feast day, and also on the great Feast of Timket (known as Epiphany or Theophany in English). David Buxton describes one such procession, on the festival of Gebre Menfes Qidus:
 To the uninstructed onlooker the climax of the service came at the end, when the tabot or ark was brought out, wrapped in coloured cloths, carried on the head of a priest. As it appeared in the doorway the women raised the ilil, a prolonged and piercing cry of joy. When the tabot goes out of the Bete Mekdes ቤተ መቅደስ, everyone goes down to the floor and says a prayer. At first the tabot remained motionless, accompanied by several processional crosses and their attendant brightly colored canopies, while a group of cantors (dabtara) performed the liturgical dance so beloved of the Abyssinians. The dancing over, a procession formed up, headed by the tabot, and slowly circled the church three times in a counter-clockwise direction. Finally the tabot was carried back into the sanctuary; all was over and the assembly broke up. Now in modern times Tabot comes out each time there is a celebration, for example on Jesus' Baptism all churches from the area come together with their tabot and celebrate.

Looting of tabots
Although Ethiopia was never colonised by the British, many tabots were looted by British soldiers during the 1868 Expedition to Abyssinia, also known as the Battle of Magdala, and is a cause of anger among Ethiopians.

Repatriation of looted tabots
The return in February 2002 of one looted tabot, discovered in the storage of St John's Episcopal Church in Edinburgh, was a cause of public rejoicing in Addis Ababa. Another was returned in 2003 after Ian McLennan recognised the ancient tabot at an auction in London. He bought it and donated it to the government of Ethiopia.

See also
Thabilitho
Altar Stone
Antimension

References

Further reading
  C.F. Beckingham and G.W.B. Huntingford, "Appendix III, The Tabot" in their translation of Francisco Alvarez, The Prester John of the Indies (Cambridge: Hakluyt Society, 1961), pp. 543–8.

External links

 Pilot Guides' Axum and the Ark

Ethiopian Orthodox Tewahedo Church
Christian religious objects
Eucharistic objects
Oriental Orthodoxy
Christian processions